Rishton is a small town in Hyndburn, Lancashire, England.  It contains eleven listed buildings, which are designated by Historic England and recorded in the National Heritage List for England.  Of these, one is listed at Grade II*, the middle grade, and the others are at Grade II.  There is one listed building inside the town itself, the war memorial.  The others are in the surrounding rural area, and most of the listed buildings are, or originated as, farmhouses.  The Leeds and Liverpool Canal passes through the area, and three bridges crossing it are listed.

Key

Buildings

References

Citations

Sources

Lists of listed buildings in Lancashire
Buildings and structures in Hyndburn
Listed buildings